Dmitry Ivanovich Ilovaysky (February 11/23, 1832, Ranenburg - February 15, 1920) was an anti-Normanist conservative Russian historian who penned a number of standard history textbooks.

Ilovaysky graduated from the Moscow University in 1854 and first attracted critical attention with his thesis on the Principality of Ryazan in 1858. He was wounded during the Siege of Plevna, in which he took an active part.

In the 1870s, Ilovaysky started publishing his extensive overview of Russian history. In his later writings, he expounded a controversial  hypothesis of Azov Rus, which was alleged to have been centered on Sarkel and Tmutarakan.

Ilovaysky was the father-in-law of Ivan Tsvetaev, who founded the Pushkin Museum of Fine Arts.

1832 births
1920 deaths
People from Chaplygin
People from Ranenburgsky Uyezd
Members of the Russian Assembly
Members of the Union of the Russian People
Historians of Russia
Historians from the Russian Empire
Journalists from the Russian Empire
Russian male journalists
Male writers from the Russian Empire
Moscow State University alumni